Shail Hada (born 11 April 1975) is an Indian playback singer born and brought up in Rajasthan.

Early life
Shail trained in Hindustani Classical music from renowned vocalist and his father Shri Jaswant Singh Hada. He studied in St. Paul's Mala Road, Kota. Later, he went on do his M.A. in Music from University of Kota and Sangeet Visharad from Gandharava Mahavidyalya under the guidance of his guru Pundit Aaskaran Sharma. After coming to Mumbai, he joined the department of music at Mumbai University where he won six gold medals at various national competitions.

Career
Shail began his career by singing background vocals for Sanjay Leela Bhansali’s Black. Since then he has collaborated with Bhansali in every film that he has directed. He got more fame because of his music in Bhansali's next directorial Saawariya which went on to become among the best musical albums of 2007. In this same movie, Shail worked as an assistant to the composer Monty Sharma. The Saawariya album gave the music industry a new voice that had the capability to hit the high notes and as well do the yodeling.

Again, in yet another Sanjay Leela Bhansali Film, Guzaarish Shail worked as the chief assistant music director. He arranged the tracks Udi and Maza Saiba and sang many tracks including the title track with KK and Udi with Sunidhi Chauhan. His classical prowess is beautifully exhibited in the song Tera Zikhr Hain.

Shail won Stardust Award in the New Sensation Male category in 2011 for the song Tera Zikr Hain in the film Guzaarish.

Shail has also ventured into the South Indian music industries, particularly Tamil and Telugu in Harris Jayaraj's compositions.

In 2011,Shail Hada was one of the singers in Laxmikant–Pyarelal's concert "Maestros" which was organized by Kakas Entertainment in India.

Discography

References

External links
 

Bollywood playback singers
Living people
1975 births
People from Kota, Rajasthan
Indian male playback singers